Izn-e-Rukhsat is a Pakistani drama serial that first aired on Geo Tv on 11 July 2016. It is produced by Abdullah Kadwani and Asad Qureshi. It on air every Monday at 8:00pm only on Geo Tv.

Plot 
Sundus comes from a broken family. She is raised by her mother after the painful separation of her parents. Although her father’s absence has taken a toll on her personality, she pretends to belong to a happy family in front of her love interest, Haider.

This camouflage is far from reality, but she has built this cover story over the years to avoid speculations. Sundus’s world is shaken when Haider’s mother (a single parent, but a widow) shows interest in meeting her parents.

At this point, Sundus’s parents, Tehreem and Ehtishaam, get in touch after years of separation and decide to live together for a few months to maintain a façade of a happy family— deciding that they will move on with their own lives after their daughter’s wedding.

This brings Ehtisham some struggle to face his second wife and son, while Tehreem has to fight with her own emotions to live with Ehtisham again despite all the baggage she has been carrying from the times they lived together. Above all, Sundus will experience family life for the first time with both her parents together— which will hopefully shape her as a better individual.

Cast 
Faisal Rehman as Ehtishaam
Sabreen Hisbani as Ehtishaam's second wife
Faiza Hasan as Tehreem Ehtishaam's First Wife
Sonia Mishal as Sundus Ehtishaam's Daughter 
Shehzad Sheikh as Haider
Humaira Bano as Haider's mother
Haroon Kadwani as Shayaan
Naeem as Daniyal
Ghulam Mohiuddin as Sundus's father	
Faiza Gillani

See also
 List of programs broadcast by Geo TV
 Geo TV
 List of Pakistani television serials

References

External links

7th Sky Entertainment
Pakistani drama television series
2016 Pakistani television series debuts
2017 Pakistani television series endings
Urdu-language television shows
Geo TV original programming